"I Hope I Get It" is a song from the musical A Chorus Line.

Production
A Chorus Line premiered Off-Broadway at The Public Theater in May 1975. The musical moved to Broadway at the Shubert Theatre in July 1975.

Synopsis
The dancers sing about their worries, fears, and doubts regarding a new job opportunity. Only a select few may be chosen, so they are trying to keep their cool under enormous pressure. They feel like everything they have done throughout their life had led up to this moment.

Analysis
Musicals101 explains:

Critical reception
Ken Mandelbaum, author of A Chorus Line and the Musicals of Michael Bennett , commented "This moment – one of the show's most celebrated – represents the perfect blend of theme, staging concept, musical underscoring, lighting, and set design that marks the entire evening".

References

Songs from A Chorus Line
Songs about dancing
Songs about theatre
1975 songs